The 2001 CPSL League Cup (known as the OZ Optics Cup for sponsorship reasons) was the 4th edition of the Canadian Professional Soccer League's league cup tournament running from June through late September. Ottawa Wizards defeated Toronto Supra 1-0 at OZ Optics Stadium in Ottawa, Ontario formally ending the Toronto Olympians league cup dynasty. The format used in the competition was the traditional group stage based on the geographic locations of the franchises, and the furthest travel distances between clubs. The tournament received a title sponsor from the OZ Optics and granted Ottawa the hosting rights with a wildcard match privilege.

Group stage

Group A

Group B

Group C

Original a 1-0 victory for Toronto Croatia, but result reversed by league after use of ineligible players.

Group D

Semi-final 
Originally a 1-0 victory for St. Catharines, but result reversed by league after use of ineligible players.

Final

References 

CPSL League Cup
CPSL League Cup
CPSL League Cup